Malir District is an administrative district of Karachi Division in Sindh, Pakistan.

History 
Before the independence of Pakistan, there were small villages of Sindhi and Kalmati Baloch in the Gadap Town and Malir Town of modern Karachi. Now both towns are developed as the suburbs of the city because of the urban sprawl.

Countryside 
Malir has been regarded in history as the countryside of Karachi City due to its open atmosphere and lush green farms, but now these are no more.

Agriculture land 
Malir was once famous for its fruit and vegetable farms; but, now due to severe scarcity of groundwater, these farmlands are being converted into residential areas, thus increasing urbanization and environmental degradation. The Society for Conservation and Protection of Environment (SCOPE) has been concerned about drought and desertification in Malir district and has launched a campaign against illegal sand and gravel mining in dry river beds of Malir and its tributaries. Because sand and gravel mining cause lowering of ground water, as rainwater can cannot percolate in the aquifer. SCOPE is developing rainwater reservoirs in drought affected rural areas.

Administrative status 
Malir District was established in 1996.

Malir District was abolished in 2000 and divided into three towns namely:

 Malir Town, 
 Bin Qasim Town 
 and Gadap Town.

On 11 July 2011, Sindh Government restored again Malir District.

Demographics 
At the time of the 2017 census, Malir district had a population of 1,924,346, of which 1,028,865 were males and 895,329 females. The rural population was 857,634 (44.57%) and urban 1,066,712 (55.43%). The literacy rate is 63.69%: 69.85% for males and 56.43% for females.

The majority religion is Islam, with 96.39% of the population. Christianity is practiced by 1.78% and Hinduism (including Scheduled Castes) is practiced by 1.77% of the population.

Languages 

At the time of the 2017 census, 31.37% of the population spoke Sindhi, 19.37% Pashto, 12.91% Urdu, 12.08% Punjabi, 8.18% Balochi, 6.83% Hindko, 3.96% Saraiki and 1.26% Brahui as their first language.

Epidemic of mysterious Chikungunya virus 
Due to pollution, mainly resulting from garbage dumps and overflow of sewerage water, Emergency declared in Malir Town, as thousands of patients were affected by mysterious Chikungunya virus in December, 2016. Despite joint denial by WHO and Health Ministry of Pakistan, Provincial Government of Sindh discloses that aedes aegypti mosquito is responsible for spreading Chikungunya in the area.

See also 
 Malir Development Authority
 Malir (disambiguation)
 Malir Expressway Project
 Malir River
 Malir District
 Malir Cantonment
 Malir Cantonment railway station

References

 
Districts of Sindh
Districts of Karachi